The Manila Airport is the Ninoy Aquino International Airport, serving Metro Manila, Philippines.

Manila Airport may also refer to:

 Manila Municipal Airport, an airport in Arkansas, US
 Sangley Point Airport, an airport in Cavite that also serves Metro Manila, Philippines
 New Manila International Airport, an under-construction airport in Bulacan, Philippines